The 1995 Houston Cougars football team, also known as the Houston Cougars, Houston, or UH represented the University of Houston in the 1995 NCAA Division I-A football season.  It was the 50th year of season play for Houston and the last season as a member of the Southwest Conference. The team was coached by Kim Helton.  The team played its home games in the Houston Astrodome and at Robertson Stadium. The following season, Houston would accept an invitation to become a member of Conference USA.

Schedule
The game between Houston and Rice would be the last game between Southwest Conference opponents. It would also be the last match-up between Houston and Rice until 1999, due to the teams joining different conferences, breaking a 25-year streak.

References

Houston
Houston Cougars football seasons
Houston Cougars football